Burlington Township is the name of some places in the U.S. state of Michigan:

 Burlington Township, Calhoun County, Michigan
 Burlington Township, Lapeer County, Michigan

See also 
 Burlington, Michigan, a village in Calhoun County
 Burlington Township (disambiguation)

Michigan township disambiguation pages